Khlong Prem Prachakon is a khlong (คลอง; canal) in central Thailand. It's considered to be the first canal dug in the reign of King Chulalongkorn (Rama V). It connects between Bangkok and Ayutthaya total distance 50,846 m. (about 50 km.).

King Chulalongkorn had initiated to dig the canal in 1869, in order to have a short-cut waterway bridging two parts of Chao Phraya River. Starting from Khlong Phadung Krung Kasem in front of Wat Sommanas Rajavaravihara beside the Government House in present to reach Tambon Ko Yai (now Tambon Bang Krasan) in Bang Pa-in in Ayutthaya. The canal flows through many districts comprising Dusit, Bang Sue, Chatuchak, Lak Si, Don Mueang of Bangkok and Mueang Pathum Thani, Sam Khok of Pathum Thani, as far as ending in Bang Pa-In in Ayutthaya. The canal helped shorten the travelling distance between Rattanakosin (Bangkok) and Ayutthaya to a great extent. Besides, the formerly rough and forested area full of fierce wild elephants frightening the farmers and people to settle. There was then widely open for development and farming. The digging was completed in 1872, as the objectives of digging this canal were to honour King Chulalongkorn and to provide the people with another convenient waterway, the canal was thus named "Khlong Prem Prachakon", which literally means "the canal of citizens joyfulness".

Once completed, His Majesty the King gave the official name and graciously have a celebration. It's considered a canal that is dug up without any fees or taxes for the excavation of the canal for the benefit of the public.

Moreover, the name of Lak Si is derived from the milestone along the canal in the past. There are periodic milestones and their numbering sequence has become the places name of its present location.

References

 Canals in Thailand
Canals opened in 1870